Stuart Graham may refer to

Stuart Graham (born 1942), British motorcycle Grand Prix racer 
Stuart Clarence Graham, Australian Army officer
Stuart Graham (actor) (born 1967), British actor